Xinhua is a town of Dongshan District, Hegang, Heilongjiang, People's Republic of China, located  south of downtown Hegang near the border with neighbouring Jiamusi City. , it has one residential community and 10 villages under its administration.

See also
List of township-level divisions of Heilongjiang

References

Township-level divisions of Heilongjiang